Reverse Psychology is the third studio album by Bomfunk MC's, released in 2004 through Polydor Records.

Personnel
Raymond Ebanks(Bo dubb) vocals

Ville Mäkinen (a.k.a. Mr Wily) bass, backing vocals

Ari Toikka (a.k.a. A.T.) drums

Riku Pentti (DJ Infekto) dj, turntables

Okke Komulainen keyboards

Jaakko Salovaara (a.k.a. JS16) producer

Track listing

External links
CD Universe

Bomfunk MC's albums
2004 albums